The University of Queensland Rugby Club is an Australian rugby club, based at the University of Queensland in Brisbane, Queensland. They currently compete in the Queensland Premier Rugby competition. They were formed in 1911, as rugby was adopted by the Sports Association at the University of Queensland as a major sport.

The University of Queensland Rugby Football Club, although recently incorporated, was founded in 1911.  Since then the club has seen several thousands of young men and women enjoy the game of Rugby and develop many friendships.

The club is affiliated with the Queensland Rugby Union (QRU) which is one of the member unions of the Australian Rugby Union (ARU).  The club is also affiliated with The University of Queensland and has a relationship with local junior club, the Kenmore Bears.

The University of Queensland Rugby Club provides an environment where excellence and academic achievements are encouraged and extolled.  Throughout the years, the club has established a proud Rugby tradition of great camaraderie, mateship and enjoyment which has significantly contributed to its ongoing success both on and off the field.

Many of the club's players have been rewarded with representative honours whilst others have further contributed to the game as coaches, managers or administrators.  215 University players have represented Queensland with 66 having been selected for Australia (7 as captain).
In terms of elite coaches, the following have represented the Club at the highest level:
 Wallaby coaches: Bob Templeton and Jake Howard
 Queensland coaches: Mark McBain and Jeff Miller
 Other Super 14 coaches: David Nucifora

Past players including Norbert Byrne, David Crombie, Dick Marks, Leo Williams (rugby union) and David Usasz have also made a mark on the game with their time served on the Boards of the Queensland Rugby Union and/or the Australian Rugby Union whilst Steve Wilson is a current member of the QRU Board having joined in March 2006.

The club is located on The University of Queensland St Lucia campus where it has its own Clubhouse and the use of three illuminated fields.  The club is administered by a committee of honorary members who are assisted by full-time staff and coaches.

The club's players were available for selection to the now defunct Australian Rugby Championship franchise Ballymore Tornadoes.

Premiership Finals results

Premiers

 1928* University 10-7 Carlton
 1929*† University 12-11 Coorparoo
 1930 University 12-3 Valleys
 1931 University 16-15 GPS
 1932 University 8-6 Brothers
 1934 University 20-18 GPS
 1938 University 14-3 Y.M.C.A.
 1941 University 23-6 Brothers
 1945 University 15-10 Brothers
 1947 University 8-6 Brothers
 1948 University 21-18 GPS
 1952 University 11-3 Brothers
 1954 University  19-3 GPS
 1955 University  18-16 Souths
 1956 University 19-6 GPS
 1957 University 23-18 Souths
 1960 University 11-6 Brothers
 1962 University 18-12 Souths
 1964 University  29-9 Teachers
 1965 University  17-15 GPS
 1967 University 17-15 GPS
 1969 University  22-14 Brothers
 1970 University  24-6 GPS
 1979‡  University 16-13 Brothers
 1988 University 18-10 Souths
 1989 University 34-9 Souths
 1990 University 19-10 Brothers
 
 2012 University 46-20 Sunnybank
 2014 University 20-18 Sunnybank
 2017 University 23-14 GPS
 2019 University 31-26 Brothers
 2021 University 29-12 GPS

Runners-Up

 1919 Brothers 20-9 University
 1933† Y.M.C.A. 17-17 University
 1939 Y.M.C.A. 15-8 University
 1943 GPS  10-8 University
 1949 Brothers 13-8 University
 1950 Brothers 21-10 University
 1953 Brothers 11-9 University
 1958 Souths  9-5 University
 1959 Brothers 13-11 University
 1961 GPS  19-13 University
 1963 Teachers 28-9 University
 1966 Brothers   36-9 University
 1968 Brothers 17-6 University
 1972 GPS 23-18 University
 1978 Brothers 19-15 University
 1982 Brothers 25-16 University
 1983 Brothers 30-15 University
 1985 Wests 10-7 University
 1992 Souths 44-10 University
 2004 Gold Coast 24-18 University
 2016 Brothers 31-28 University
 2018 GPS 23-16 University
 2020 Easts 33-18 University
 2022 Wests 44-27 University

Notes

 * University played in the Brisbane Rugby League premiership when the rugby union competition was disbanded from 1920 to 1927, and played both codes from 1928 to 1935.
† Challenge Final - Some competitions in the early 1900s included the right to challenge the winner of the Premiership Final if a club won the Minor premiership and did not win the Premiership Final. The resultant match was called the Challenge Final and was later called the Grand Final.  
‡ The 1979 Grand Final was replayed after a 24–24 draw.

National Club Champions
University have been the Australian club champions on two occasions (1990 and 2011).

Rivalry with Brothers Rugby Club
The long tradition of clashes with Brothers first began in senior competition on 8 June 1912, with Brothers running out victors 24 - 0. The tradition of hard, close fought games between these two clubs remains a feature of the Brisbane club scene and there have been many memorable tussles over the years, particularly in grand finals. The most famous being the 24-all draw in 1979 that resulted in a rematch where University won 16–13 in a tight match. The latest bragging rights are with University after a 31–26 win in the 2019 final, the last time the teams have met in a grand final.

U19 Colts
After great success in the early 2000s university colts dropped off the radar in 03 and 04 until 2005 when under the guidance of Andrew Tucker (Premier Director of Rugby) and the new appointments of Paul "Taffy Longman" (Head Colts Coach 05-06)and Rob Murdoch (Colts Assistant Coach 05-06) the club was able to recruit a forward pack with many state and national representatives.  The club signed 6 starting QLD/ACT Representatives that played in front of a small but skilled back line.  The 2005 premiership came after a landmark game against GPS in the semi final, and a crushing win over brothers in the final.

In 2006 the club was pro-active in recruiting a number of Australian representatives and a high-profile New Zealand u19 representative. Indifferent form and injuries in the early part of the season had many critics claiming the uni boys could not retain their title, pressure to perform was high however the Uni Colts showed all the critics what sort of squad they were by taking the field for their remaining 8 fixtures and securing victories for all 8 in a row, successfully defending their 2005 title to be crowned 2006 premiers.
Back to back premierships in the U19's was a fantastic result and one that uni had not seen for some time.

Internationals 

 Eric Francis
 Tom Lawton, Snr
 James Clark - past Wallaby captain
 P.A.CLARK
 F.J.WHYATT
 Bill White
 Vay Wilson - past Wallaby captain
 Bill Monti
 V.M.NICHOLSON
 Clem Windsor
 Keith Winning - past Wallaby captain
 C.J.PRIMMER
 W.I.HATHERELL
 J.M.O'NEILL
 A.G.R.SHEIL
 K.J.DONALD
 Charles Wilson- past Wallaby captain
 P.M.JAMES
 K.K.LARKIN
 T.BAXTER
 R.T.POTTER
 Lloyd McDermott
 R.J.P.MARKS
 Jules Guerassimoff
 John K WOLFE

 R.K.TRIVETT
 R.G.TEITZEL
 R.C.S.MANNING
 D.C.CROMBIE
 D.A.TAYLOR
 S.C.GREGORY
 K.R.BELL
 B.R.BROWN
 Mark Loane - past Wallaby captain
 P.G.BATCH
 W.S.ROSS
 Geoff Shaw
 Duncan Hall
 A.J.PARKER
 Andy McIntyre
 Chris Roche
 Michael Lynagh - past Wallaby captain
 Jeff Miller
 Cameron Lillicrap
 Nigel T KASSULKE
 Michael Cook
 Greg Martin
 Brendon Nasser
 Mitchell Palm

 Peter Slattery
 David Nucifora
 Pat Howard
 Fletcher Dyson
 Nick Stiles
 Nathan Sharpe - past Wallaby captain
 Drew Mitchell
 Stephen Moore
 Josh Valentine
 James Horwill - Wallaby captain
 Mitchell Chapman
 Luke Morahan
 Rod Davies
 Mike Harris
 James Hanson
 Tate McDermott

See also

 Queensland Premier Rugby
 Rugby union in Queensland
University of Queensland
University of Queensland Business Association
 University of Queensland Union (UQU)

External links
 UQ Rugby - Official website
 A Hundred Years of the Red Heavies : a celebration - John Oxley Library Blog, State Library of Queensland

 
University and college rugby union clubs in Australia
Rugby union teams in Queensland
Sporting clubs in Brisbane
1911 establishments in Australia
Rugby clubs established in 1911